William Pinkney (March 17, 1764February 25, 1822) was an American statesman and diplomat, and was appointed the seventh U.S. Attorney General by President James Madison.

Biography
William Pinkney was born in 1764 in Annapolis in the Province of Maryland. His parents' home was on the banks of the Severn River, from where the family could see the Chesapeake Bay.

Pinkney attended the private King William school. His teacher was a Mr. Brefhard. Although Pinkney left school at the age of thirteen, he had impressed his teacher with his intelligence, and Brefhard agreed to give the youth private lessons at home.

Pinkney studied medicine (which he did not practice) and "read the law" with an established firm, as was the practice at the time for aspiring lawyers. He was admitted to the bar in 1786. After practicing law for two years in Harford County, Maryland, Pinkney was elected as a delegate to Maryland's state constitutional convention.

Pinkney was an excellent orator who possessed an impressive command of language. He was said to have been articulate and pleasing in manner.

After beginning his law practice, he married Anne Rodgers. They had ten children together. Edward Coote Pinkney, born seventh, was ranked as an accomplished poet posthumously. He died of tuberculosis before his 26th birthday.

Political career
In April 1788, Pinkney was elected a delegate to the convention of the State of Maryland, which ratified the United States Constitution. This marked the beginning of his political career.

Pinkney served in numerous electoral offices, at the local, state and national level. He was elected to and served in the Maryland House of Delegates from 1788 to 1792 and then again in 1795. He was elected mayor of Annapolis, serving from 1795 to 1800.

He was elected in 1790 as a U.S. Congressman from Maryland's 3rd congressional district, serving in 1791. After the war of 1812, Pinkney was elected in 1814 from the fifth district, and served from 1815 until 1816.

He also had numerous political appointments. In 1801 he was appointed Attorney General for the District of Pennsylvania, by President Thomas Jefferson. Jefferson next appointed him as Attorney General of Maryland, where he served from 1805 to 1806.

Pinkney was nominated as a diplomat, serving with James Monroe as co-U.S. Ministers to the Court of St James's in Great Britain, 1806 to 1807. President Jefferson asked them to negotiate an end to harassment of American shipping, but Britain showed no signs of improving relations. The men negotiated the Monroe–Pinkney Treaty, but it lacked provisions to end British impressment of American sailors, and was subsequently rejected by President Jefferson and never implemented.

Pinkney was Minister Plenipotentiary from 1808 until 1811. He returned to Maryland, serving in the Maryland State Senate in 1811. In 1811 he joined President James Madison's cabinet as his Attorney General.

He was commissioned as a major in the U.S. Army during the War of 1812 and was wounded at the Battle of Bladensburg, Maryland in August 1814. After the War, he served as congressman from the fifth district of Maryland from 1815 to 1816. He was next appointed by President James Monroe as the U.S. Minister Plenipotentiary to Russia from 1816 until 1818, along with a special mission to the Kingdom of Naples.

Pinkney successfully argued many important cases before the Supreme Court, including the landmark case of McCulloch v. Maryland (1819), in which the right of the U.S. Congress to charter the Bank of the United States was upheld.

In 1818 Pinkney was elected by the state legislature (as was the practice then) as a U.S. Senator from Maryland, serving from 1819 until his death in 1822. He is buried at the Congressional Cemetery in Washington, D.C.

Criticism

Writer, critic, and fellow Baltimore lawyer John Neal dedicated eight pages in his 1823 novel Randolph to criticizing William Pinkney. Though written before Pinkney's death, it was published shortly afterward with a footnote explaining that the author acknowledged Pinkney's death but decided to publish the book as originally written anyway. Though Neal referred to him as "the greatest lawyer in America," he also characterized his speeches as "a compound of stupendous strength; feeble ornament; affected earnestness, and boisterous, turbulent declamation," concluding that "God never meant William Pinkney for an orator." Neal's insults went as far as to call Pinkney "a notorious sloven" who could be seen "wiping his nose and lips on the sleeve of his coat."

On the basis of these printed insults, Pinkney's son Edward Coote Pinkney challenged Neal to a duel, which Neal refused. The episode likely contributed to Neal's decision to leave Baltimore later that year.

See also
List of United States Congress members who died in office (1790–1899)

References

Bibliography
 
  Book

  e'Book

  e'Book

External links

William Pinkney, Seventh Attorney General 1811-1814; U.S. Dept. of Justice

1764 births
1822 deaths
Mayors of Annapolis, Maryland
Ambassadors of the United States to Russia
Ambassadors of the United States to the United Kingdom
Maryland Attorneys General
Maryland state senators
Members of the Maryland House of Delegates
United States Army officers
United States Attorneys General
United States senators from Maryland
Burials at the Congressional Cemetery
Democratic-Republican Party United States senators
Madison administration cabinet members
19th-century American diplomats
Democratic-Republican Party members of the United States House of Representatives from Maryland
18th-century American politicians
19th-century American politicians